Chris Nielsen (born February 16, 1980) is a Tanzanian-born Canadian former professional ice hockey centre. Nielsen was drafted in the 2nd round, 36th overall by the New York Islanders in the 1998 NHL Entry Draft. He played parts of two seasons with the Columbus Blue Jackets.

Nielsen was born in Tanzania while his Canadian father was stationed there working for the Canadian International Development Agency. His family moved back to Canada when he was three, and he grew up on a farm near the small town of Goodlands, Manitoba.

Playing career
Nielsen played junior hockey with the Calgary Hitmen of the Western Hockey League.  He was a member of the 1998–99 team that won the President's Cup, and got within a game of winning the Memorial Cup.  He won the Doug Wickenheiser Memorial Trophy in 1999–2000 as the WHL's Humanitarian of the Year.

Nielsen turned pro in 2000, playing three seasons with the Syracuse Crunch of the American Hockey League, earning two callups to the Blue Jackets during that time.  He then bounced around between the Chicago Wolves, Manitoba Moose and San Antonio Rampage of the AHL and the Laredo Bucks of the Central Hockey League before heading to Europe to play in Germany in 2005–06.  Nielsen retired from professional hockey in 2006.

After retiring from hockey, Nielsen went back to school at the University of Manitoba and was the colour commentator for the Manitoba Moose at their home games.

Nielsen is now a resident in orthopaedic medicine at the University of Calgary.

Career statistics

Regular season and playoffs

International

Awards and honours
1999 - WHL Daryl K. (Doc) Seaman Trophy
2000 - WHL Daryl K. (Doc) Seaman Trophy.
2000 - WHL Humanitarian of the Year Award.

Transactions
June 27, 1998 - Drafted in the 2nd round, 36th overall by the New York Islanders in the 1998 NHL Entry Draft.
May 11, 2000 - Traded by the New York Islanders to the Columbus Blue Jackets for the Blue Jackets' 4th round selection (Jonas Rönnqvist) and 9th round selection (Dmitri Altarev) in the 2000 NHL Entry Draft.
December 2, 2002 - Traded by the Columbus Blue Jackets with Petteri Nummelin to the Atlanta Thrashers for Tomi Kallio and Pauli Levokari.
January 20, 2003 - Traded by the Atlanta Thrashers with Chris Herperger to the Vancouver Canucks for Jeff Farkas.

References

External links

1980 births
Canadian ice hockey centres
Calgary Hitmen players
Chicago Wolves players
Columbus Blue Jackets players
Kassel Huskies players
Laredo Bucks players
Living people
Manitoba Moose players
New York Islanders draft picks
San Antonio Rampage players
Syracuse Crunch players
Canadian expatriate ice hockey players in Germany